The women's discus throw event at the 1983 Summer Universiade was held at the Commonwealth Stadium in Edmonton, Canada on 8 July 1983.

Results

References

Athletics at the 1983 Summer Universiade
1983